Engden is a community in the district of the County of Bentheim in Lower Saxony.

Geography

Location
Engden lies between Nordhorn and Schüttorf. It belongs to the Joint Community (Samtgemeinde) of Schüttorf, whose administrative seat is in the like-named town.

Politics
Engden was and is dominated by a Catholic church milieu, and as such, markedly few Engdeners opted for the NSDAP in Nazi times.

Mayor
The honorary mayor Gerhard Theißing was elected on 9 September 2001.

Culture and sightseeing

Buildings
The Katholische Kirche Abt St. Antonius (church) was built in 1899 as a neo-Romanesque brick structure.

The Dobbe warehouse may have been built about 1800 and is said to be northwest Germany’s oldest maintained rural grain distillery building, and as such it is an important industrial monument.

The Bügeleisen-Haus, or Clothes Iron House, came to be because the farmers would only relinquish to the house builder a narrow, tapered lot whose odd layout has resulted in the house's having no right angles at all. Building work began on the house “about 1900”, but it was finished only after the First World War.

Economy and infrastructure

Transport
Autobahnen A 31 and A 30 lie 6 km from the community and are easily reached.

Curiosity
Children from Engden go to school or kindergarten in Emsbüren, in another district.

References

Further reading
Herbert Wagner: Militär in der Region. Dokumentation über den Artillerieschieß- und Bombenabwurfplatz Engdener Wüste/Nordhorn-Range. Selbstverlag, Bad Bentheim 1989, 
Herbert Wagner: Die Gestapo war nicht allein  Politische Sozialkontrolle und Staatsterror im deutsch-niederländischen Grenzgebiet 1929-1945. LIT, Münster 2004,  (contains, among other things, the Catholic community’s resistance to the Nazis)

External links
Joint community’s webpage

County of Bentheim (district)